Paracles palustris is a moth of the subfamily Arctiinae first described by Peter Jörgensen in 1935. It is found in Paraguay.

References

Moths described in 1935
Paracles